The 12th New Brunswick Legislative Assembly represented New Brunswick between December 28, 1837, and December 1, 1842.

The assembly sat at the pleasure of the Governor of New Brunswick John Harvey. William MacBean George Colebrooke became governor in April 1841.

Charles Simonds was chosen as speaker for the house.

History

Members

Notes:

References
Journal of the House of Assembly of the province of New Brunswick from ... December [1837] to ... March [1838] (1838)

Terms of the New Brunswick Legislature
1840 in Canada
1841 in Canada
1842 in Canada
1837 in Canada
1838 in Canada
1839 in Canada
1837 establishments in New Brunswick
1842 disestablishments in New Brunswick